Nav (Croatian, Czech, Slovak: Nav, Mavka or) is a phrase used to denote the souls of the dead in Slavic mythology. The singular form (Nav or Nawia) is also used as a name for an underworld, over which Veles exercises custody—it is often interpreted as another name for the underground variant of the Vyraj (heaven or paradise).

Etymology
The words nawia, nav and its other variants are most likely derived from the Proto-Slavic , meaning "corpse", "deceased". Cognates in other Indo-European languages include Latvian  ("death"), Lithuanian  (“death”), Old Prussian  (“body, flesh”), Old Russian  (“corpse, dead body”) and Gothic  (“dead body, corpse”).

 could be cognate with the Sanskrit word Naraka, referring to the concept of hell in Hinduism.

As souls or spirits

The nawie, nawki, sometimes also referred to as lalki (all plural forms) was used as a name for the souls of the dead. According to some scholars (namely Stanisław Urbańczyk, among others), this word was a general name for demons arising out of the souls of tragic and premature deaths, killers, warlocks, the murdered and the Drowned Dead. They were said to be hostile and unfavourable towards humans, being jealous of life. According to folk tales, the nawie usually took the form of birds.

As an underworld
The phrase Nawia (Polish) or Nav (used across Slavic tongues) was also utilised as a name for the Slavonic underworld, ruled by the god Veles, enclosed away from the world either by a living sea or river, according to some beliefs located deep underground. According to Ruthenian folklore, Veles lived on a swamp in the centre of Nav, where he sat on a golden throne at the base of the Cosmic Tree, wielding a sword. Symbolically, the Nav has also been described as a huge green plain—pasture, onto which Veles guides souls. The entrance to Nav was guarded by a Zmey. It was believed the souls would later be reborn on earth. It is highly likely that these folk beliefs were the inspiration behind the neopagan idea of Jav, Prav and Nav in the literary forgery known as the Book of Veles.

See also
Prav-Yav-Nav
Rusalka
Unclean spirit

Footnotes

References

Further reading
 Kajkowski, Kamil. 2015. “Slavic Journeys to the Otherworld. Remarks on the Eschatology of Early Medieval Pomeranians" [Słowiańskie wędrówki W zaświaty. Kilka Uwag Na Temat Eschatologii wczesnośredniowiecznych Pomorzan]. Studia Mythologica Slavica 18 (July). Ljubljana, Slovenija: 15-34. https://doi.org/10.3986/sms.v18i0.2828.

Locations in Slavic mythology
Slavic legendary creatures
Slavic mythology
Underworld